Hospice Sainte-Cunégonde (or Hospice de Sainte-Cunégonde, or Asile de Sainte-Cunégonde) was an orphanage, child care centre and nursing home for the destitute in Montreal's Sainte-Cunégonde neighbourhood, today known as Little Burgundy. It was operated by the Grey Nuns, a Roman Catholic religious order based in Montreal. The hospice was established in 1889 in the former Brewster mansion, and moved in 1896 to its own building at 2625 Albert Street at the corner of Atwater Avenue. Albert Street is today named Lionel-Groulx Avenue. The building had a stone facade but its interior structure was built of timber.

On June 15, 1951, the building was destroyed by fire. 35 people were killed in the fire, including six nuns.

References

Orphanages in Canada
Le Sud-Ouest
Demolished buildings and structures in Montreal
1951 fires in North America
1951 in Canada
1951 in Quebec
20th century in Montreal
Building and structure fires in Canada
Disasters in Quebec
History of Montreal
June 1951 events in Canada
Man-made disasters in Canada
Residential building fires